IdeaPad (stylized as IDEAPΛD and formerly ideapad) is a line of consumer-oriented laptop computers designed, developed and marketed by Lenovo. The IdeaPad mainly competes against computers such as Acer's Aspire, Dell's Inspiron and XPS, HP's Pavilion, Envy and Stream, Samsung's Sens and Toshiba's Satellite.

History

The IdeaPad laptops were announced in January 2008. The first three models in the product line were the Y710, the Y510, and the U110. Some of the features that defined these first three models were widescreens, VeriFace facial recognition, frameless screens, touch controls, and Dolby speaker systems.

The IdeaPad design marked a deviation from the business-oriented ThinkPad laptops, towards a more consumer-oriented look and feel. Among these changes were a glossy screen and the absence of the traditional ThinkPad TrackPoint. Notebook Review said the keyboard had a ‘"distinctive ThinkPad feel" and "the touchpad and touchpad buttons were smooth and responsive."

On September 21, 2016, Lenovo confirmed that their Yoga series is not meant to be compatible with Linux operating systems, that they know it is impossible to install Linux on some models, and that it is not supported. This came in the wake of media coverage of problems that users were having while trying to install Ubuntu on several Yoga models, including the 900 ISK2, 900 ISK For Business, 900S, and 710, which were traced back to Lenovo intentionally disabling and removing support for the AHCI storage mode for the device's solid-state drive in the computer's BIOS, in favor of a RAID mode that is only supported by Windows 10 drivers that come with the system. (This is also noted to make creation of Windows installation media more difficult than it normally is, as the process requires extracting a storage driver and loading it during the Windows installation process, or else the installer will not see the SSD.)

As of February 2020, Lenovo IdeaPad S940 is the world's cheapest 4K laptop. This IdeaPad notebook, made of aluminium, is the world's first laptop to feature a curved Contour Display.

Current model lines

IdeaPad 1 series (20082021, 2023, 2024) 

One of the laptops in the series is Slim 1i, which costs only $504 or $403.50. Slim 1, however, is more expensive than Slim 1i, at $850.

Slim 1i
 • Intel Celeron® N4120 Processor (4 Cores, 4 Threads, up to 2.6 GHz)
 • Windows 11 Home in S Mode
 • 4GB Soldered DDR4 2400 RAM
 • 128GB eMMC SSD
 • Integrated Intel® Graphics
 • 14" or 15.6" (1920 × 1080) TN 220nits Anti-glare
 • AC 2×2 Wireless with Bluetooth® 5.0
 • Stereo Speakers, 1.5W × 2, Dolby Audio
 • 7.5 - 12.5 Months On-site Warranty (Premium Care)

IdeaPad 3 series (unknown  current)

IdeaPad 5 series (unknown  current)

Flex series (2013  current) 

The Lenovo IdeaPad Flex is a  dual-mode laptop line by Lenovo; Unlike the Lenovo IdeaPad Yoga line of devices the keyboard does not bend back entirely to allow use as a tablet, it's only a dual-mode laptop (except some models). Its keyboard rotates behind the display beyond 300 degrees in order to put the device into "stand mode." Stand mode brings the user closer to the screen for watching videos and using touch-enabled apps and removes the visual distraction from the keyboard. Some models have orange accents, a feature often found in Lenovo's designs.

Early Ideapad Flex has a screen-inch oriented numbering scheme (like "Flex 11", "Flex 13"), current models have an additional market positioning numbering - 3 for low-cost line, 5 for mainstream models, 7 for more expensive line (e.g "Flex 5 11", "Flex 5 13", "Flex 7 13").

According to a review from NDTV Gadgets, "It's clear that Lenovo allocated most of this device's cost to its more visible features. In terms of functionality, it is best thought of as a modern-day netbook: good enough for surfing the Web, creating basic documents and watching movies now and then, but not suitable for any serious work."

Gaming series (unknown  current) 
IdeaPad Gaming 3 was announced in April, 2020.

Discontinued series

IdeaPad 130, 330, 530 and 730 lines (20192020)

IdeaPad 730 Series 

The Lenovo IdeaPad 730 series was a class of home and office PCs. The IdeaPad 730 series are respectively an 13-inch laptop designed specifically. It was developed by Lenovo in the United States in 2019. It has no multi-touch displays. Both make use of Intel Core i7 processors. Inches of laptop:
 IdeaPad 730s (13")

IdeaPad 530 Series 

The Lenovo IdeaPad 530 series was a class of home and office PCs. The IdeaPad 530 series are respectively an 15-inch laptops designed specifically. It was developed by Lenovo in the United States in 2019. It has no multi-touch displays. Both make use of Intel Core processors. 
Inches of laptop: 
 IdeaPad 530s (15")

IdeaPad 330 Series 

The Lenovo IdeaPad 330 series was a class of home and office PCs. The IdeaPad 330 series are respectively an 14-inch, 15-inch and 17-inch laptop designed specifically. It was developed by Lenovo in the United States in 2019. It has no multi-touch displays. Both make use of Intel Core processors. 
Inch of laptop:
 IdeaPad 330 (17")
 IdeaPad 330 (15")
 IdeaPad 330 (14")
 IdeaPad 330s (15")
 IdeaPad 330s (14")

IdeaPad 130 Series 

The Lenovo IdeaPad 130 series was a class of home and office PCs. The IdeaPad 130 series are respectively an 11-inch, 14-inch   and 15-inch laptops designed specifically. It was developed by Lenovo in the United States in 2019. Both make use of Intel Core processors.
Inches of laptop:
 IdeaPad 130s (11")
 IdeaPad 130s (14")
 IdeaPad 130 (15")
 IdeaPad 130 (14")

IdeaPad 120, 320, 520 and 720 lines (20182019)

IdeaPad 720 Series 

The Lenovo IdeaPad 720 series was a class of home and office PCs. The IdeaPad 720 series are respectively an 13-inch laptop designed specifically. It was developed by Lenovo in the United States in 2018. It has no multi-touch displays. Both make use of Intel Core i7 processors. The 720 series uses an Nvidia GeForce video card.
Inches of laptop:
 IdeaPad 720s (15")
 IdeaPad 720s (14")

IdeaPad 520 Series 

The Lenovo IdeaPad 520 series was a class of home and office PCs. The IdeaPad 520 series are respectively an 14-inch and 15-inch laptops designed specifically. It was developed by Lenovo in the United States in 2018. It has no multi-touch displays. Both make use of Intel Core processors. The 520 series uses an AMD Radeon video card.
Inches of laptop: 
 IdeaPad 520s (14")
 IdeaPad 520 (15")

IdeaPad 320 Series 

The Lenovo IdeaPad 320 series was a class of home and office PCs. The IdeaPad 320 series are respectively an 14-inch, 15-inch and 17-inch laptop designed specifically. It was developed by Lenovo in the United States in 2018. It has no multi-touch displays. Both make use of Intel Core processors. 
Inch of laptop:
 IdeaPad 320s (14")
 IdeaPad 320s (15")
 IdeaPad 320 (17")
 IdeaPad 320 (15")

IdeaPad 120 Series 

The Lenovo IdeaPad 120 series was a class of home and office PCs. The IdeaPad 120 series are respectively an 11-inch and 14-inch laptops designed specifically. It was developed by Lenovo in the United States in 2018. Both make use of Intel Core processors.
Inches of laptop:
 IdeaPad 120s (14")
 IdeaPad 120s (11")

IdeaPad 110, 310, 510 and 710 lines (20172018)

IdeaPad 710 Series 

The Lenovo IdeaPad 710 series was a class of home and office PCs. The IdeaPad 710 series are respectively an 13-inch laptop designed specifically. It was developed by Lenovo in the United States in 2017. It has no multi-touch displays. Both make use of Intel Core i7 processors. The 700 series uses an Nvidia GeForce video card.
Inches of laptop:
 IdeaPad 710s Plus (13")
 IdeaPad 710s (13")

IdeaPad 510 Series 

The Lenovo IdeaPad 510 series was a class of home and office PCs. The IdeaPad 510 series are respectively an 14-inch and 15-inch laptops designed specifically. It was developed by Lenovo in the United States in 2017. It has no multi-touch displays. Both make use of Intel Core processors. The 510 series uses an AMD Radeon video card.
Inches of laptop: 
 IdeaPad 510s (14")
 IdeaPad 510 (15")

IdeaPad 310 Series 

The Lenovo IdeaPad 310 series was a class of home and office PCs. The IdeaPad 310 series are respectively an 15-inch laptop designed specifically. It was developed by Lenovo in the United States in 2017. It has no multi-touch displays. Both make use of Intel Core processors. 
Inch of laptop:
 IdeaPad 310 (15")

IdeaPad 110 Series 

The Lenovo IdeaPad 110 series was a class of home and office PCs. The IdeaPad 110 series are respectively an 11-inch, 14-inch, 15-inch and 17-inch laptops designed specifically. It was developed by Lenovo in the United States in 2017. Both make use of Intel Core processors.
Inches of laptop:
 IdeaPad 110 (17")
 IdeaPad 110 (15")
 IdeaPad 110 (14")
 IdeaPad 110s (11")

IdeaPad 100, 300, 500 and 700 lines (20152017)

IdeaPad 700 Series 

The Lenovo IdeaPad 700 series was a class of home and office PCs. The IdeaPad 700 series are respectively an 15-inch and 17-inch laptops designed specifically. It was developed by Lenovo in the United States in 2015. It has no multi-touch displays. Both make use of Intel Core i7 processors. The 700 series uses an Nvidia GeForce video card.
Inches of laptop:
 IdeaPad 700 (17")
 IdeaPad 700 (15")

IdeaPad 500 Series 

The Lenovo IdeaPad 500 series was a class of home and office PCs. The IdeaPad 500 series are respectively an 14-inch and 15-inch laptops designed specifically. It was developed by Lenovo in the United States in 2015. It has no multi-touch displays. Both make use of Intel Core i7 processors. The 500 series uses an AMD Radeon video card.
Inches of laptop: 
 IdeaPad 500 (15")
 IdeaPad 500s (14")
 IdeaPad 500 (14")

IdeaPad 300 Series 

The Lenovo IdeaPad 300 series was a class of home and office PCs. The IdeaPad 300 series are respectively an 14-inch, 15-inch and 17-inch laptops designed specifically. It was developed by Lenovo in the United States in 2015. It has no multi-touch displays. Both make use of Intel Core i7 processors. The 300 series uses an AMD Radeon video card.
Inches of laptop:
 IdeaPad 300 (17")
 IdeaPad 300 (15")
 IdeaPad 300 (14")

IdeaPad 100 Series 

The Lenovo IdeaPad 100 series was a class of home and office PCs. The IdeaPad 100 series are respectively an 11-inch, 15-inch and 17-inch laptops designed specifically. It was developed by Lenovo in the United States in 2015. Both make use of Intel Core i5 processors.
Inches of laptop:
 IdeaPad 100s (14")
 IdeaPad 100s (11")
 IdeaPad 100 (15")
 IdeaPad 100 (14")

305 series

The Lenovo IdeaPad 305 series was a class of home and small business professional PCs. The IdeaPad 305 series are respectively an 14-inch and 15-inch laptops designed specifically. It was developed by Lenovo in 2015. Both make use of Intel Core i3 or i5 processors. The 305 series uses an AMD Radeon video card. 
Inches of laptop:

 IdeaPad 305 (14")
 IdeaPad 305 (15")

G series

U series (20082014) 

The IdeaPad U series was a line of a "high-fashion"-oriented laptops with mainstream performance and consumer-grade quality. They had a different screen sizes: a netbook-like laptops (11.1"-12", 2008-2010 years), and long-running 13", 14" and 15" series of models – with integrated, or entry-level discrete GPUs, and low-power processors.

V series

“Combining security and productivity features with a simple design, powerful technology, and all-day battery life, Lenovo V Series laptops are perfect for small business professionals who demand long-term performance and reliability.”

Z Series (20102012) 

The IdeaPad Z Series laptops were designed primarily for entry-level multimedia users. The first Z Series IdeaPad laptops were the Z360, Z460 and Z560, with 13-inch, 14-inch, and 15-inch screens respectively.

The 2011 IdeaPad laptops launched by Lenovo were the Intel Sandy Bridge processor based Z370, Z470, Z570, and AMD Llano APU processor based Z575.

Features

Y series (20082016) 

The first laptops in the IdeaPad Y Series line were showcased in CES 2008.
These were the IdeaPad Y710 and Y510 laptops, with 17-inch and 15-inch screens, respectively. The Y series is a line of ordinary laptops with gaming-oriented appearance – a marked difference from ThinkPads.

The laptops in the IdeaPad Y Series were Y400, Y450, Y460, Y460p, Y470, Y480, Y510, Y560, Y560p, Y570, Y580 and Y560d. The current models offered in a "Legion" subbrand, and comes with a 14", 15" and 17" screens.

The notable models of Y series is the 2016's Y900 with a slim mechanical keyboard, 2013's Y400 and Y500 with an advanced UltraBay with optional secondary discrete graphic card, and 2008's Y710 with optional "Lenovo Game Zone" module.

Ideapad Yoga series

Ideapad Yoga is an obsolete derivative of an Ideapad line. But currently, after producing a few shared laptop models, the Yoga line was divided into a different market niche.

IdeaPad Yoga 13

The Lenovo IdeaPad Yoga 13 is a hybrid notebook/tablet computer created by Lenovo and first announced at the International CES 2012 in January. The 13-inch Yoga was released by Lenovo on Oct. 26, 2012 at a price of $1,099. Best Buy released an alternative version of the Yoga 13 with an Intel Core i5 processor (vs. Lenovo's base model's i3 processor) and no Microsoft Office (whereas Lenovo's base model includes Microsoft Office). Its smaller cousin, Yoga 11, which runs Windows RT (as opposed to the Yoga 13, running Windows 8), was released in December 2012 for $799. With products such as Yoga 11 and 13, Lenovo has been able to take more than 40% of the American retail market of computers priced at least $900 that run Microsoft's Windows 8.

In an editors' review, CNET stated that, "The Yoga works best as a full-time laptop and part-time tablet, because when it's folded back into a slate, you still have the keyboard pointing out from the back of the system. Although the keyboard and touch pad are deactivated in this mode, it's still not ideal. Plus, despite the hype, Windows 8 is still not a 100-percent tablet-friendly OS, and there are some frustrations that span all the Windows 8 tablet-style devices we've tested. The Yoga certainly seems to be everyone's choice for a great Windows 8 ambassador – both Microsoft and Intel have touted it as a best-in-class example, and Best Buy is currently featuring it in a television ad."

IdeaPad Yoga 11
The Lenovo IdeaPad Yoga 11 is a hybrid laptop/tablet Windows RT based computer released in late 2012. The Yoga 11 and Yoga 13 computers both get their names from their unique design that enables the devices to rotate their screen backwards to become tablet devices. According to PC Pro, "The hybrid design is immensely flexible. Prop the Yoga 11 up in 'tent mode', and the touchscreen can be angled just so. Lay the keyboard facing the desk, and the screen can be tilted back and forth while sturdy-feeling hinges keep the display from flopping backwards. Fold the screen all the way back, and hidden magnets hold it clamped shut against the underside, transforming it into a tablet." The Yoga 11 has slim chassis with a matte orange exterior finish and an all-black interior that weighs 2.79 pounds. It has a full-size QWERTY keyboard. According to TechRadar, the "large, well-cushioned keys offer a far better experience than Microsoft Surface, and there's a large trackpad as well."

The Yoga 11 is powered by a quad-core Nvidia Tegra 3 that runs at a maximum clockspeed of 1.3 GHz and features an integrated graphics processor. The Tegra 3 is also found in numerous Android-based tablets. 2 GB of RAM comes standard. This relatively small amount of RAM is sufficient due to the reduced memory requirements of Windows RT applications. The Yoga 11 is sold with solid-state drives in 32 GB and 64 GB capacities. The Yoga 11 runs the Windows RT operating system. Microsoft Office 2013 ships pre-installed. Like all Windows RT devices, the Yoga 11 cannot run software designed for earlier versions of Windows, only apps designed for the new Metro interface are compatible. The Yoga 11 has an 11.6-inch glossy screen that makes use of IPS technology and runs at a resolution of 1366×768. The screen has a maximum brightness of only 344 nits, but has a measured contrast ratio of 1,146:1. There two USB 2.0 ports, an SD card reader, a 3.5 mm headphone jack, and a standard HDMI output. There is a built-in 720P webcam.

In its review TechRadar stated, "The Lenovo IdeaPad Yoga 11 is a stylish, lightweight and durable laptop that neatly doubles as a tablet. At 11 inches, it's portable and thin enough to be used in tablet form, but like its bigger brother, having the keys on the reverse affecting your grip makes it far from ideal.If you're looking for a laptop form factor for work, which doubles as a tablet for basic apps and sofa surfing, then the Yoga 11 is worth serious consideration, although we'd advise you to head to your nearest PC superstore to give it the once over. It's not for everyone, and we'd primarily recommend it to someone looking for a small Windows 8 laptop who doesn't want to miss out on enjoying all the touchscreen goodness that Windows 8 has to offer."

IdeaPad Yoga 11S
The IdeaPad Yoga 11S is a compact ultralight hybrid notebook/tablet computer scheduled for release in 2013. Like the Yoga 13 and the Yoga 11 the Yoga 11S gets its name from its ability to take on various form factors due to its screen being mounted on a special two-way hinge. The Yoga 11S runs the full version of Microsoft's Windows 8 operating system. The Yoga 11s will ship in the United States in June 2013 with a starting price of $799.

Like other models in the IdeaPad Yoga line, the Yoga 11S has a convertible form factor. Its screen can flip into a range of positions that allow it to serve as a regular laptop and tablet device as well as being able to function in "tent mode" and "stand mode." Like the Yoga 11, the 11S will be available in silver and clementine orange. The Yoga 11S can be configured with processors as powerful as Intel's "Ivy Bridge" Core i7 processor, will support up to a 256 GB SSD, and can hold as much as 8 GB of RAM. The Yoga 11S has an 11.6" display with available options for resolutions of 1366×768 pixels and 1600×900 pixels.

CNET writes, "The 11-inch Yoga – Lenovo's clever laptop/tablet hybrid – had a great physical design, but ran the lame Windows RT operating system. The 13-inch Yoga ran full Windows 8, but was a bit too large for tablet duties. The upcoming Yoga 11S may be the "just right" marriage of the two: the smaller and lighter 11-inch chassis, but running full Windows 8 – while still keeping the unique folding design."

IdeaPad Yoga Tablet

The IdeaPad Yoga Tablet is an Android tablet with a multi-mode device with a rear kickstand designed to allow it to be placed upright for viewing videos and other media or tilted for easier text entry. The Yoga Tablet has a round battery that can last as long as 18 hours. It comes in models with 10-inch and 8-inch screens. Internal storage varies from 16 gigabytes to 32 gigabytes.
An upgraded version was added in February 2014, called Lenovo Yoga Tablet 10 HD+, which featured a Full HD display and a Qualcomm Snapdragon processor.

Currently the combined Ideapad Yoga line has been discontinued, and Lenovo Yoga brand is now an actual self-standing product line.

Miix series (2013  unknown) 

The Lenovo Miix was a series of multi-mode computing devices that function as both a tablet and a notebook computer. The Miix line started with simple Miix branding, in 2015 - 20** called as "IdeaPad Miix", and then again rebranded to simply "Miix" in 20**, following to discontinuation in 20**.

Former Miix line uses a Intel Atom CPUs, last models can have a ARM-based CPU.

S series (2008  unknown) 
 

The first laptop in Lenovo's netbook IdeaPad S Series was scheduled for launch in September 2008 but was delayed, with an estimated release date indicated as November. Ultimately, the laptop was released in September in China, but in October in the United States.

S series line starts with a S10 laptop, low-cost, Intel Atom powered 10.2 inch subnotebook. Couple of further S-series laptops gets an Atom CPU, but, once Atom line was discontinued, main line of lightweight S series laptops switches to a low-power AMD A-series, Intel Celeron, Pentium and low-cost versions of Y-series CPUs.

C series
IdeaPad C340 was announced in February 2019.

L series
IdeaPad L340 was announced in April 2019.

See also
 LePad
 IdeaPhone
 ThinkPad

References

External links

Lenovo's Official web site for IdeaPad laptops

 
Consumer electronics brands
Computer-related introductions in 2008
Products introduced in 2008
Lenovo laptops
Lenovo